Greetham may refer to:

 Greetham, Lincolnshire
 Greetham, Rutland
 HMS Greetham, Ham class minesweeper, sold to Libya in 1962

See also
 Greatham (disambiguation)